St. Mark Catholic School is a Catholic school catering to students from grades Pre-K to 8. It is located in Wilmington, North Carolina. St. Mark Catholic School operates from inside St. Mark Catholic Church. It adjoins St. Mark Catholic Church, where students attend mass every Wednesday.

References

Catholic schools in North Carolina
Schools in Wilmington, North Carolina
Educational institutions established in 2002
2002 establishments in North Carolina